A tri-series in Scotland took place between 1 July and 3 July involving New Zealand, Ireland and Scotland. On 1 July, New Zealand beat Ireland by 290 runs. This became a new world record for the biggest margin of victory by runs. The previous world record was India's 257 run drubbing of Bermuda in the 2007 Cricket World Cup.

Points table

Tri-Series

1st match

2nd match

3rd match

References

International cricket competitions in 2008
Associates Tri-series In Scotland, 2008
Associates Tri-series In Scotland, 2008
Associates Tri-series In Scotland, 2008